Mamadou Philippe Karambiri is a Burkinabè evangelical charismatic  Pastor, born March 7, 1947, in Tougan. He is the president of the International Evangelism Center - African Interior Mission which he founded in 1987. He was knighted by the National Order of Burkina Faso in 2005 and in 2007 he received a honoris causa doctorate in Divinity from the Logos Christian University of Florida in the United States.

Biography
Karambiri was born on March 7, 1947, in Tougan in a Muslim family. During a meeting with young French evangelical missionaries and after witnessing the appearance of Jesus Christ, while preparing his State doctorate in financial economics in Toulouse in February 1975, he experienced a new birth. In an interview granted in December 2015, he gives details of this spiritual turning point. He underlines that the important thing is not first to change religion, but to discover who Jesus Christ is, and to enter into relation with him. After his conversion and during his stay in France as a student, he attended the "Assembly of God of Toulouse" church. Back in Burkina Faso, he was Director of Promotion at the National Office of Foreign Trade, then Commercial Director of Faso Fani and finally Director General of SO.VOL.COM.

Ministry
In 1985, he started a prayer group with his family which reached 500 people in 1987. That same year, he founded the International Evangelism Center - African Interior Mission in Ouagadougou. In January 1990, he resigned from his secular duties to become Pastor full time.

Personal life
He marries Marie Sophie Tou, a state nurse on duty in pediatrics at the Yalgado Ouédraogo Hospital. They have four children, two girls and two boys. His wife died on March 10, 2008.  Since then, he remarried on May 29, 2010, with Hortense Palm, who occupies a pastoral ministry in the church.

Awards 
In 2005, he was made a knight of the national order of Burkina Faso. In 2007, he received a honoris causa doctorate in Divinity from the Logos Christian University of Florida in the United States.

References 

Content in this edit is translated from the existing French Wikipedia article at :fr:Mamadou Philippe Karambiri; see its history for attribution.

1947 births
Charismatics pastors
Burkinabé Christians
Toulouse 1 University Capitole alumni
Living people
Converts to Protestantism from Islam
Burkinabé former Muslims